The 1984–85 New York Rangers season was the franchise's 59th season. In the regular season, New York had a 26–44–10 record and finished fourth in the Patrick Division. The Rangers made the NHL playoffs, where they lost to the Philadelphia Flyers in the first round, three games to none.

Regular season

Final standings

Schedule and results

|- align="center" bgcolor="white"
| 1 || 11 || Hartford Whalers || 4 - 4 OT || 0-0-1
|- align="center" bgcolor="#FFBBBB"
| 2 || 13 || @ Minnesota North Stars || 3 - 1 || 0-1-1
|- align="center" bgcolor="#FFBBBB"
| 3 || 14 || Minnesota North Stars || 3 - 1 || 0-2-1
|- align="center" bgcolor="#CCFFCC"
| 4 || 20 || @ Washington Capitals || 6 - 5 || 1-2-1
|- align="center" bgcolor="#CCFFCC"
| 5 || 21 || New York Islanders || 6 - 5 || 2-2-1
|- align="center" bgcolor="#CCFFCC"
| 6 || 25 || @ New Jersey Devils || 11 - 2 || 3-2-1
|- align="center" bgcolor="#CCFFCC"
| 7 || 27 || @ Quebec Nordiques || 5 - 2 || 4-2-1
|- align="center" bgcolor="#FFBBBB"
| 8 || 28 || Boston Bruins || 6 - 4 || 4-3-1
|- align="center" bgcolor="#FFBBBB"
| 9 || 30 || @ New York Islanders || 7 - 3 || 4-4-1
|-

|- align="center" bgcolor="#CCFFCC"
| 10 || 3 || @ Pittsburgh Penguins || 7 - 5 || 5-4-1
|- align="center" bgcolor="#CCFFCC"
| 11 || 7 || Washington Capitals || 4 - 3 || 6-4-1
|- align="center" bgcolor="#CCFFCC"
| 12 || 9 || New York Islanders || 5 - 4 OT || 7-4-1
|- align="center" bgcolor="#FFBBBB"
| 13 || 11 || Los Angeles Kings || 4 - 2 || 7-5-1
|- align="center" bgcolor="#FFBBBB"
| 14 || 14 || @ Chicago Black Hawks || 6 - 4 || 7-6-1
|- align="center" bgcolor="#FFBBBB"
| 15 || 17 || @ New York Islanders || 10 - 4 || 7-7-1
|- align="center" bgcolor="#FFBBBB"
| 16 || 18 || New Jersey Devils || 6 - 0 || 7-8-1
|- align="center" bgcolor="#CCFFCC"
| 17 || 21 || Buffalo Sabres || 3 - 2 || 8-8-1
|- align="center" bgcolor="#FFBBBB"
| 18 || 24 || @ Quebec Nordiques || 8 - 3 || 8-9-1
|- align="center" bgcolor="#FFBBBB"
| 19 || 25 || Quebec Nordiques || 3 - 2 OT || 8-10-1
|- align="center" bgcolor="#FFBBBB"
| 20 || 28 || Washington Capitals || 2 - 1 || 8-11-1
|- align="center" bgcolor="white"
| 21 || 30 || Toronto Maple Leafs || 3 - 3 OT || 8-11-2
|-

|- align="center" bgcolor="#CCFFCC"
| 22 || 1 || @ Toronto Maple Leafs || 4 - 1 || 9-11-2
|- align="center" bgcolor="#FFBBBB"
| 23 || 3 || Philadelphia Flyers || 6 - 2 || 9-12-2
|- align="center" bgcolor="white"
| 24 || 5 || Calgary Flames || 4 - 4 OT || 9-12-3
|- align="center" bgcolor="#FFBBBB"
| 25 || 7 || Pittsburgh Penguins || 4 - 3 OT || 9-13-3
|- align="center" bgcolor="#FFBBBB"
| 26 || 8 || @ Philadelphia Flyers || 4 - 2 || 9-14-3
|- align="center" bgcolor="#CCFFCC"
| 27 || 10 || Los Angeles Kings || 4 - 2 || 10-14-3
|- align="center" bgcolor="white"
| 28 || 12 || Boston Bruins || 3 - 3 OT || 10-14-4
|- align="center" bgcolor="#FFBBBB"
| 29 || 15 || @ Washington Capitals || 4 - 2 || 10-15-4
|- align="center" bgcolor="#FFBBBB"
| 30 || 16 || Washington Capitals || 6 - 3 || 10-16-4
|- align="center" bgcolor="#FFBBBB"
| 31 || 19 || Winnipeg Jets || 5 - 4 || 10-17-4
|- align="center" bgcolor="#CCFFCC"
| 32 || 22 || @ New Jersey Devils || 5 - 3 || 11-17-4
|- align="center" bgcolor="white"
| 33 || 23 || Montreal Canadiens || 3 - 3 OT || 11-17-5
|- align="center" bgcolor="#FFBBBB"
| 34 || 26 || @ Detroit Red Wings || 5 - 2 || 11-18-5
|- align="center" bgcolor="#FFBBBB"
| 35 || 29 || @ Montreal Canadiens || 7 - 3 || 11-19-5
|- align="center" bgcolor="#CCFFCC"
| 36 || 30 || St. Louis Blues || 6 - 2 || 12-19-5
|-

|- align="center" bgcolor="#CCFFCC"
| 37 || 2 || Vancouver Canucks || 6 - 0 || 13-19-5
|- align="center" bgcolor="white"
| 38 || 5 || @ Boston Bruins || 3 - 3 OT || 13-19-6
|- align="center" bgcolor="#CCFFCC"
| 39 || 6 || New Jersey Devils || 5 - 4 OT || 14-19-6
|- align="center" bgcolor="#FFBBBB"
| 40 || 9 || @ Winnipeg Jets || 6 - 5 OT || 14-20-6
|- align="center" bgcolor="white"
| 41 || 12 || @ St. Louis Blues || 4 - 4 OT || 14-20-7
|- align="center" bgcolor="#FFBBBB"
| 42 || 14 || New Jersey Devils || 2 - 1 || 14-21-7
|- align="center" bgcolor="white"
| 43 || 16 || Buffalo Sabres || 2 - 2 OT || 14-21-8
|- align="center" bgcolor="#CCFFCC"
| 44 || 18 || @ New Jersey Devils || 9 - 6 || 15-21-8
|- align="center" bgcolor="#FFBBBB"
| 45 || 19 || @ Washington Capitals || 7 - 1 || 15-22-8
|- align="center" bgcolor="#FFBBBB"
| 46 || 22 || @ Buffalo Sabres || 3 - 2 || 15-23-8
|- align="center" bgcolor="#CCFFCC"
| 47 || 24 || Detroit Red Wings || 3 - 1 || 16-23-8
|- align="center" bgcolor="#FFBBBB"
| 48 || 26 || @ Montreal Canadiens || 3 - 2 || 16-24-8
|- align="center" bgcolor="#CCFFCC"
| 49 || 27 || Minnesota North Stars || 3 - 2 || 17-24-8
|- align="center" bgcolor="#FFBBBB"
| 50 || 31 || @ Calgary Flames || 7 - 2 || 17-25-8
|-

|- align="center" bgcolor="#FFBBBB"
| 51 || 2 || @ Edmonton Oilers || 5 - 1 || 17-26-8
|- align="center" bgcolor="#FFBBBB"
| 52 || 3 || @ Vancouver Canucks || 4 - 1 || 17-27-8
|- align="center" bgcolor="#FFBBBB"
| 53 || 5 || @ Los Angeles Kings || 7 - 5 || 17-28-8
|- align="center" bgcolor="#FFBBBB"
| 54 || 7 || @ New York Islanders || 7 - 5 || 17-29-8
|- align="center" bgcolor="white"
| 55 || 9 || @ Hartford Whalers || 2 - 2 OT || 17-29-9
|- align="center" bgcolor="#FFBBBB"
| 56 || 10 || @ Philadelphia Flyers || 3 - 2 || 17-30-9
|- align="center" bgcolor="#CCFFCC"
| 57 || 15 || Edmonton Oilers || 8 - 7 || 18-30-9
|- align="center" bgcolor="#CCFFCC"
| 58 || 17 || New York Islanders || 9 - 3 || 19-30-9
|- align="center" bgcolor="#FFBBBB"
| 59 || 21 || Hartford Whalers || 4 - 3 OT || 19-31-9
|- align="center" bgcolor="#CCFFCC"
| 60 || 22 || @ Pittsburgh Penguins || 8 - 3 || 20-31-9
|- align="center" bgcolor="#FFBBBB"
| 61 || 25 || Winnipeg Jets || 12 - 5 || 20-32-9
|- align="center" bgcolor="#FFBBBB"
| 62 || 28 || Washington Capitals || 5 - 4 || 20-33-9
|-

|- align="center" bgcolor="#FFBBBB"
| 63 || 2 || @ Pittsburgh Penguins || 5 - 4 || 20-34-9
|- align="center" bgcolor="#CCFFCC"
| 64 || 3 || Pittsburgh Penguins || 7 - 3 || 21-34-9
|- align="center" bgcolor="#CCFFCC"
| 65 || 6 || @ Vancouver Canucks || 6 - 3 || 22-34-9
|- align="center" bgcolor="#FFBBBB"
| 66 || 7 || @ Calgary Flames || 11 - 5 || 22-35-9
|- align="center" bgcolor="white"
| 67 || 9 || @ Edmonton Oilers || 3 - 3 OT || 22-35-10
|- align="center" bgcolor="#FFBBBB"
| 68 || 11 || Chicago Black Hawks || 4 - 3 OT || 22-36-10
|- align="center" bgcolor="#FFBBBB"
| 69 || 13 || Philadelphia Flyers || 5 - 2 || 22-37-10
|- align="center" bgcolor="#FFBBBB"
| 70 || 16 || @ Pittsburgh Penguins || 5 - 0 || 22-38-10
|- align="center" bgcolor="#CCFFCC"
| 71 || 17 || New Jersey Devils || 7 - 3 || 23-38-10
|- align="center" bgcolor="#FFBBBB"
| 72 || 21 || @ Philadelphia Flyers || 8 - 4 || 23-39-10
|- align="center" bgcolor="#FFBBBB"
| 73 || 22 || @ Detroit Red Wings || 5 - 3 || 23-40-10
|- align="center" bgcolor="#FFBBBB"
| 74 || 24 || New York Islanders || 5 - 2 || 23-41-10
|- align="center" bgcolor="#CCFFCC"
| 75 || 26 || Pittsburgh Penguins || 5 - 4 || 24-41-10
|- align="center" bgcolor="#FFBBBB"
| 76 || 30 || @ Philadelphia Flyers || 3 - 0 || 24-42-10
|- align="center" bgcolor="#CCFFCC"
| 77 || 31 || Toronto Maple Leafs || 7 - 5 || 25-42-10
|-

|- align="center" bgcolor="#FFBBBB"
| 78 || 2 || Philadelphia Flyers || 2 - 1 || 25-43-10
|- align="center" bgcolor="#CCFFCC"
| 79 || 4 || @ St. Louis Blues || 5 - 4 || 26-43-10
|- align="center" bgcolor="#FFBBBB"
| 80 || 7 || @ Chicago Black Hawks || 3 - 1 || 26-44-10
|-

Playoffs

Key:  Win  Loss

Player statistics
Skaters

Goaltenders

†Denotes player spent time with another team before joining Rangers. Stats reflect time with Rangers only.
‡Traded mid-season. Stats reflect time with Rangers only.

Awards and records

Transactions

Draft picks
New York's picks at the 1984 NHL Entry Draft in Montreal, Quebec, Canada at the Montreal Forum.

Farm teams
 New Haven Nighthawks – American Hockey League

See also
 1984–85 NHL season

References

New York Rangers seasons
New York Rangers
New York Rangers
New York Rangers
New York Rangers
1980s in Manhattan
Madison Square Garden